The organic compound 1,1,1-trichloroethane, also known as methyl chloroform, is a chloroalkane with the chemical formula CH3CCl3. It is an isomer of 1,1,2-trichloroethane. This colorless, sweet-smelling liquid was once produced industrially in large quantities for use as a solvent. It is regulated by the Montreal Protocol as an ozone-depleting substance and its use is being rapidly phased out.

Production
1,1,1-Trichloroethane was first reported by Henri Victor Regnault in 1840. Industrially, it is usually produced in a two-step process from vinyl chloride. In the first step, vinyl chloride reacts with hydrogen chloride at 20-50 °C to produce 1,1-dichloroethane:
CH=CHCl + HCl → CHCHCl
This reaction is catalyzed by a variety of Lewis acids, mainly aluminium chloride, iron(III) chloride, or zinc chloride. The 1,1-dichloroethane is then converted to 1,1,1-trichloroethane by reaction with chlorine under ultraviolet irradiation:
CHCHCl + Cl → CHCCl + HCl
This reaction proceeds at 80-90% yield, and the hydrogen chloride byproduct can be recycled to the first step in the process. The major side-product is the related compound 1,1,2-trichloroethane, from which the 1,1,1-trichloroethane can be separated by distillation.

A somewhat smaller amount of 1,1,1-trichloroethane is produced from the reaction of 1,1-dichloroethene and hydrogen chloride in the presence of an iron(III) chloride catalyst:
CH=CCl + HCl → CHCCl

1,1,1-Trichloroethane is sold with stabilizers because it is unstable with respect to dehydrochlorination and attacks some metals. Stabilizers comprise up to 8% of the formulation, including acid scavengers (epoxides, amines) and complexants.

Uses
1,1,1-Trichloroethane is generally considered a non-polar solvent. Owing to the good polarizability of the chlorine atoms, it is a superior solvent for organic compounds that do not dissolve well in hydrocarbons such as hexane. It is an excellent solvent for many organic materials and also one of the least toxic of the chlorinated hydrocarbons. Prior to the Montreal Protocol, it was widely used for cleaning metal parts and circuit boards, as a photoresist solvent in the electronics industry, as an aerosol propellant, as a cutting fluid additive, and as a solvent for inks, paints, adhesives, and other coatings. 1,1,1-Trichloroethane is also used as an insecticidal fumigant.

It was also the standard cleaner for photographic film (movie/slide/negatives, etc.). Other commonly available solvents damage emulsion and base (acetone will severely damage triacetate base on most films), and thus are not suitable for this application. The standard replacement, Forane 141 is much less effective, and tends to leave a residue. 1,1,1-Trichloroethane was used as a thinner in correction fluid products such as liquid paper. Many of its applications previously used carbon tetrachloride (which was banned in US consumer products in 1970). In turn, 1,1,1-trichloroethane itself is now being replaced by other solvents in the laboratory.

Safety
Although not as toxic as many similar compounds, inhaled or ingested 1,1,1-trichloroethane does act as a central nervous system depressant and can cause effects similar to those of ethanol intoxication, including dizziness, confusion, and, in sufficiently high concentrations, unconsciousness and death. Fatal poisonings and illnesses linked to intentional inhalation of trichloroethane have been reported. The removal of the chemical from correction fluid commenced due to Proposition 65 declaring it hazardous and toxic.

Prolonged skin contact with the liquid can result in the removal of fats from the skin, resulting in skin irritation.

Atmospheric concentration

The Montreal Protocol targeted 1,1,1-trichloroethane as one of those compounds responsible for ozone depletion and banned its use beginning in 1996. Since then, its manufacture and use have been phased out throughout most of the world.  Its atmospheric presence has declined rapidly due to its relatively short atmospheric lifetime of about 5 years.

References

Further reading

Chloroalkanes
Excipients
GABAA receptor positive allosteric modulators
Glycine receptor agonists
Greenhouse gases
Halogenated solvents
Hazardous air pollutants
Hypnotics
Sedatives
5-HT3 agonists